Warming up is the preparation for physical exertion or a performance by exercising or practising gently beforehand. (For the specific vocal preparation, see Vocal warm-up.)

Warm up or Warm Up may also refer to:

 Warm Up (EP), by Bad Gyal, 2021
 Warm Up!, a racing simulator
 The Warm Up, a 2009 mixtape by J. Cole
 Opening act, act performed before the headline